Fortress North America is a term used both during the Second World War and more often in the Cold War to refer to the option of defending Canada and the United States against their enemies if the rest of the world were lost to them.

In the period up to World War II, it was associated with isolationism, particularly in the US.

It was viewed only as a last-ditch option in case Europe, Asia and Africa were overrun by the fascists or Communists.  At the outset of the Cold War, there were some, especially in the United States, who supported the isolationist idea of fortifying the United States and abandoning other involvements overseas or with Latin America. This option was rejected with the formation of NATO and the decision to permanently station troops in Europe.

During the Cold War significant planning and effort went into developing continental defense systems. Most notable were the formation of NORAD and the setting up of radar lines in the Canadian Arctic. Many of those more internationally oriented were concerned that a Fortress North America (US and Canada only) strategy would lead to isolation from the rest of the world, and a strategically indefensible position in the long-term.

Further reading 
 
 
 

Canada–United States relations
Cold War terminology